Viacheslav Voron  (real name: Viacheslav Borisovich Cherny; born October 21, 1967 in Mariupol, Ukraine) is a singer-songwriter of the Russian and Ukrainian chanson, music producer. The author of over 60 songs in styles chanson and romance of the street.

Biography
Born on October 21, 1967, in the city of Mariupol, Ukraine. He studied at secondary school No. 4 Mariupol. In 9 years, began to study in accordion music Studio. A year later he enrolled in music school. Independently mastered the technique of playing the guitar. After graduating the eighth grade school, he entered the Industrial College, where he was immediately enrolled in guitar ensemble. Around this time, Vyacheslav invite in vocals and instrumentals bands in DK Koksohimzavoda. In 1987, in the army he creates a band "Action" and within two years band playing on garrisons. In 1989, Vyacheslav was studies the Moscow Institute of Steel and Alloys. But creativity is not throwing. Wrote songs, poems, and participated in amateur performances of the Institute. In 1996, recorded the first album "Забери меня мать ..." and from that moment begins a creative way to chanson.

Discography
 1996 Zaberi menya mati...
 1997 Krasnie tramvaichiki
 1998 Dusha zhiganska
 1999 Ne davi na gaz
 2000 Eshelon

Video
 1997 Zhizn blatnaya moya
 1999 Na volu 
 2008 Uezjaut na grajdanku dembelya
 2009 Mariupol

References

External links
 On Moscow FM
 Russian chanson

Books 
 Легенды русского шансона (Р. Никитин, 2002)
 Легенды и звёзды шансона. От Вертинского до Шуфутинского (М. Кравчинский, Н. Насонова, 2008)
 Пепел и золото Акелы, или Ответ знает только Пепел. (Игорь Чубаха, Александр Логачев, 2003)
 Петлюра. Юрий Барабаш. Тексты песен, ноты, аккорды.(Нота-Р, 2003)

1967 births
Russian chanson
Living people
People from Mariupol
Russian bards
Russian musicians
Russian record producers
Russian songwriters